Four Ashes is a hamlet in the parish of Hughenden, in Buckinghamshire, England.

It was the site of Rockhalls manor house - home to the medieval Wellesbourne family and later home to the Widmer family.
A farm on the site still bears the Rockhalls name and parts of the old manorial moat are visible.

Local legend tells of a dragon that lived at Four Ashes and whose image was painted onto the walls of the old manor house. Also, a dell known as "Hags Pit" on the edge of the hamlet is alleged to have been connected to witchcraft.

References

External links
 Four Ashes replanted (Bucks Free Press article)

Hamlets in Buckinghamshire
Witchcraft in England
Dragons